Luella A. Varney Serrao (1865–1935) was an American sculptor. She was known for her portraits of notable Americans.

Biography
Serrao née Varney was born on August 11, 1865 in Angola, New York. She moved to Cleveland as a young girl, where she studied at the Cleveland School of Art. After high school she moved to Rome, Italy where she earned a degree from the University of Rome. In Rome she met Teodoro Serrao whom she married in 1889. They lived in Rome. Upon his death in 1907 she returned to Cleveland.

Serrao created portraits of Susan B. Anthony, Mary Baker Eddy, Julia Ward Howe, Theodore Roosevelt, Mark Twain and Henry Mower Rice.

She exhibited her work at the Pennsylvania Academy of the Fine Arts and the Art Institute of Chicago.

Serrao exhibited her work at the Palace of Fine Arts and The Woman's Building at the 1893 World's Columbian Exposition in Chicago, Illinois.

Her work, “An Archbishop of Odessa” can be found in the Roman Catholic Church in Odessa, Russia.

She died in 1935.

Gallery

References

External links
 

1865 births
1935 deaths
American women sculptors
19th-century American women artists
20th-century American women artists
19th-century American sculptors
20th-century American sculptors
People from Angola, New York
Sculptors from New York (state)
Artists from Cleveland
Sculptors from Ohio
Sapienza University of Rome alumni
Cleveland School of Art alumni